is a national highway of Japan connecting the cities of Hachinohe in southeastern Aomori Prefecture and Ōdate in northern Akita Prefecture in northern Japan.

Route description

From its junction with National Route 454 in Hachinohe to the beginning of its unsigned concurrency with National Route 103 in Kazuno, the highway is known as the Shirahagi Line.

History
National Route 104 was established by the Cabinet of Japan as a second-class national highway in 1953. The system of different classes of national highways was abolished in 1970, in turn, the highway was designated as National Route 104.

Major intersections
All junctions listed are at-grade intersections unless noted otherwise.

See also

References

External links

104
Roads in Akita Prefecture
Roads in Aomori Prefecture